Diatomocera tenebricosa is a species of snout moth in the genus Diatomocera. It was described by Zeller in 1881. It is found in Colombia.

References

Moths described in 1881
Phycitinae
Taxa named by Philipp Christoph Zeller